Detective Knight: Rogue (also known as simply Knight) is a 2022 American action film directed by Edward John Drake, from a screenplay by Drake and Corey Large, and produced by Large, Randall Emmett, and George Furla. Serving as the first installment of the Detective Knight trilogy, it stars Bruce Willis, Lochlyn Munro, and Jimmy Jean-Louis.

Detective Knight: Rogue was released by Lionsgate in limited theaters and VOD on October 21, 2022, followed by its release on DVD and Blu-ray on November 29, 2022.

Plot
In Los Angeles, four masked men robbed a truck full of cash. After the police arrive, the criminals steal a car from a nearby parking lot. However, the police corner the group, resulting in one of the robbers firing blindly at them. Detective Knight and his partner Fitz exchange fire with the criminals, resulting in Fitz getting severely wounded. In the chaos, the robbers flee the scene. While Fitz is taken to the hospital, the robbers escape to New York City on a private plane. The robbers are revealed to be Casey, the leader of the crew; Mercer, the hot-head of the group; Mike, Casey's best friend; and Sykes, the girl with the most intelligence among the group. Officer Sango explains to Knight that this kind of heist is taking place all over the country, and there is one plane seen in every city the theft has taken place in. He also says that the aircraft belongs to Winna, the owner of a New York-based shell company. From this intel, Knight states that he knows Winna and that he is originally a bookie.

In New York City, Casey's wife tells him that he is not the same person he used to be, while also expressing concerns about his drug abuse. Casey promises her that he will make everything ok, right after meeting Winna and getting his next task – snatching a one-of-a-kind sports card from a high-security auction in New York. Later, Casey tells Sykes and Mike about the job and states that they will not have Mercer on the team as he can't trust him with his temper. Initially hesitant, Mike and Sykes agree. Meanwhile, Sango and Knight ask Winna about the heists and his possible involvement with them. Winna refuses to talk and the two detectives leave empty-handed. Outside, they question Winna's bodyguard Brigga, who gives him Casey's name and tells him to stay away from Winna. Knight and Sango track down Casey and Mercer. Knight recognizes Casey as a former American football player, but as they have no evidence, they get nothing out of them. Meanwhile, Sango meets with the NYPD police chief and offers a mutual partnership. Though they are all on the same side, their jurisdiction interest and egos collide, and the NYPD police chief makes it clear that she doesn't need help.

Meantime, Casey and his team find out about Detective Knight's past. They discover that he was a NYPD officer who shot Jerry Leach, while off-duty. Jerry Leach was an ex-con and bank robber who killed Knight's father when Knight was a toddler. So, he killed Jerry Leach out of vengeance. Winna was his CI at that time, and he informed him about Leach's hideout. Though fascinated with this, Casey and the team do not give much weight to Knight and plan their next move. They rehearse their heist and decide to send Sykes to snatch the card, as her skills are perfect for the job. On auction day, Winna reaches the auction place with his girlfriend, Casey, Mike, and Sykes. When Sykes enters the building, she is spotted by an undercover cop who tracks her down. Although she manages to escape, the cops become aware of the heist. She snatches the card and gives it to Winna. The cops catch Sykes, but do not find anything on her.

At the crime scene, Sango tells Knight that the card is missing. Afterwards, Winna comes to Knight and reminds him of his favour, in an effort to coerce Knight to allow him to leave the crime scene. When Knight doesn't budge, he threatens to kill Fitz back in LA. With no choice left, Knight has to give him clearance. Furious with this act, Sango tells Knight that he doesn't deserve the police badge. Casey and Mike reach their hideout, where Mike asks Casey to rescue Sykes. Casey tells him that Winna will get her back as he has the police force in his pockets. Afterwards, Casey gets a call from Winna, who tells him that he had the card, but during the investigation, one of the cops retrieved it. So now, Casey and Mike have to get it back, while Winna will look after Sykes. While Casey is talking on the phone, assassins come to kill Casey and Mike. While Casey fights back, Mike is shot multiple times and dies. Casey realizes that these assassins are Winna's men. With no options left, he flees the hideout.

The police department is furious with Knight, and the NYPD police chief tells Sango that if any other mishap happens from Knight's side, they will put him behind bars. Sango realizes Knight's dilemma and tells Knight that all the criminals are former athletes. He also tells him that they tracked down Sykes's other two accomplices but find out Mike is dead. They realize that Winna is cutting off the loose ends. To capture Winna, Sango offers to help Knight, but he becomes hesitant. In response, Sango tells him that it is his job to capture the criminals, and Fitz would do the same if he were in his position.

While on the run, Casey meets with Mercer who tells him about his situation. Casey realizes that the only way to live is to kill Winna before he kills him. To reach out to Winna, he makes a plan with Mercer to steal the card from the police station. On the day of Halloween, Mercer goes to rob a bank to divert the cops' attention as Casey, at the same time, enters and snatches the card from the police station. The plan fails, as Mercer is shot by Sango, and Casey gets caught by Knight. Knight gives the card to Casey, which is hidden inside his police badge. Casey and Knight go to confront Winna, who orders Fitz to be killed after spotting them through the security camera. In LA, Fitz fights and kills an assassin, while Knight kills Winna and Brigga. Sango comes with the police, who arrest Knight, while Casey flees the scene. Casey goes home to his family, but the cops find and arrest him. His wife and daughter are shocked by this, but they eventually back away from Casey as they, too, give up on him.

Cast

Production
In October 2021, Bruce Willis signed on to star in an action film under the working title Knight. The film was written and directed by Edward John Drake and produced by Randall Emmett and George Furla. Principal photography began in Las Cruces, New Mexico on October 25, 2021. Knight is the first New Mexico film production since the manslaughter incident on Rust. Due to the Rust incident, the production of Knight decided to scrap all plans to use blanks in their prop guns. In an interview with KOAT-TV, Drake said, in reference to not using blanks while filming Knight, "it means a lot more work in post-production for the film to make these weapons look realistic, which is what the blanks are intended to do, so it did increase some costs there but they were more than willing and happy to make those changes to ensure everybody's safety."

Parts of downtown Las Cruces were temporarily closed due to the production's filming schedule. Filming moved to Vancouver, Canada, from November 17 to December 14, 2021. By January 9, 2022, filming had wrapped, according to Trevor Gretzky, who co-stars in the film alongside Willis. Detective Knight: Rogue is one of the last films to star Willis, who retired from acting because he was diagnosed with frontotemporal dementia.

Release
Detective Knight: Rogue was released by Lionsgate in limited theaters and VOD on October 21, 2022, followed by its release on DVD and Blu-ray on November 29, 2022.

Box office
As of February 15, 2023, Detective Knight: Rogue grossed $95,244 in the United Arab Emirates, South Africa, Lithuania, and South Korea.

Critical reception

Anton Bitel of Projected Figures gave the film a negative review, highlighting the film's "lack of substance". Jeffrey Anderson, of Common Sense Media, gave the film a 2/5 rating, writing "Certainly one of the better Bruce Willis low-budget action movies, this one still suffers from confusing bits, as well as an uncomfortable vacancy where its star ought to have been". Lukas Spathis of Voices From The Balcony gave the film a lightly positive review, saying the film "isn't a great crime film but after a groggy first act, it does give way to some cool crimes, decent characters, and a degree of novelty given the holiday it eventually uses when it's done being cliche". Brian Orndorf of Blu-ray.com gave the film a "D", writing "Drake and co-writer Large do manage to sneak in one bizarre turn of plot before succumbing to the punishing sameness of all these Willis-branded VOD time-killers". In a positive review, Film Threat writer Jason Delgado gave the film a 7/10 rating, summarizing that "the script and Willis offer up a rim-rattling-like dunk of a treat for fans".

Sequels

References

External links
 
 

2020s American films
2020s English-language films
2022 action adventure films
2022 action thriller films
2022 films
2022 independent films
American action films
American films about Halloween
American films about revenge
American independent films
Films about the Los Angeles Police Department
Films about the New York City Police Department
Films directed by Edward John Drake
Films shot in New Mexico
Films shot in Vancouver
Films set in Los Angeles
Films set in New York City
Lionsgate films